Radha (or Radhika) is a Hindu goddess and eternal consort of Krishna.

Radha or Radhika  may also refer to:

 Radha Krishna, deity forms of Radha and Krishna worshiped in Vaishnavism
 Radha (novel), a 2005 novel by Krishna Dharabasi
 Radha (Mahābhārata), the foster mother of Karna
 Radha (film), a 2017 Indian film
 Radha (ballet) - a modern dance work by Ruth Saint Denis, music by Leo Delibes
 Raḍha, an historical region of the Indian subcontinent, in present-day Bengal region

People

Film and television
 Radha (actress) (born 1965), Indian film actress
 Kumari Rhadha, South Indian film actress, teacher and sister of Kumari Kamala
 Radha Mitchell, Australian film actress
 Radha Bharadwaj, Indian filmmaker, producer and screenwriter
 Raadhika Sarathkumar, Indian actress, producer and entrepreneur
 Radhika Pandit, Indian film actress
 Radhika Chaudhari, Indian actress and director
 Radhika Kumaraswamy, widely credited as Kutty Radhika, Indian film actress
 Radhika Apte (born 1985), Indian film actress
 Radhika (Malayalam actress), Indian film actress
 Radhika, the main character of the Zee TV serial Choti Bahu

Politics
 V. Radhika Selvi, Minister of State for home affairs and Member of 14th Lok Sabha from Tiruchendur
 Radha Poonoosamy (1924–2008), Mauritian politician, first women cabinet minister, and feminist activist
 Radhika Ranjan Gupta (died 1988), Chief Minister of Tripura, India
 Radhika Balakrishnan, women's right activist
 Radhika Coomaraswamy, Sri Lankan activist
 Radha Raghavan (born 1961), Indian National Congress politician

Music
 Radha Cuadrado, Filipina singer
 Radha Jayalakshmi, Indian carnatic vocalist and playback singer
 Radhika Mohan Maitra (1917–1981), Indian sarod player

Others
 Radha Stirling, British-Indian activist and lawyer 
 Radhika Ramana Dasa, Vaishnava scholar
 Radhika Roy, Indian media baron
 Radhika Jones, American magazine editor
 Radha Kessar, Indian mathematician
 Radha Vembu (born 1972/1973), Indian billionaire businesswoman, majority owner of Zoho Corporation

See also
 Radika